"What You Gave Me" is a hit duet written and produced by Ashford & Simpson and issued as a single originally by the vocal duo of Marvin Gaye and Tammi Terrell in 1969 on the Tamla label.

Recorded in the final throes of the Gaye-Terrell duet recordings, the song became the second single from their album, Easy. As with much of the album, there is debate over who sang with Gaye: Terrell, who was undergoing treatment for brain cancer, or the track's co-writer and co-producer, Valerie Simpson.

While Gaye later insisted that Simpson stood in for Terrell, Simpson has maintained that Terrell took part in the recordings. Whatever the case, the song gave the duo a modest charting, peaking at number forty-nine pop and number six R&B.

Cash Box described it as a "finely honed vocal collaboration."

Chart history

Weekly charts
Marvin Gaye and Tammi Terrell

Diana Ross

Year-end charts

Later versions
David Ruffin also recorded the song for his 1969 album Feelin' Good. It was revived years later as a club hit by Diana Ross in 1978. Her version peaked at #86 on the R&B charts.

Credits
All vocals by Marvin Gaye & Tammi Terrell/Valerie Simpson
Produced by Ashford & Simpson
Instrumentation by The Funk Brothers

References

External links
  (Marvin Gaye & Tammi Terrell)
  (Diana Ross)

1969 singles
1978 singles
Marvin Gaye songs
Tammi Terrell songs
Songs written by Valerie Simpson
Songs written by Nickolas Ashford
Male–female vocal duets
Diana Ross songs
Song recordings produced by Ashford & Simpson
1969 songs
Tamla Records singles